Camerton may refer to:

 Camerton, Cumbria, a village in England
 Camerton, East Riding of Yorkshire, a village in England
 Camerton, Somerset, a village in England
 Camerton (band), a pop band from Mongolia